Braithwaite & Co. Limited is an Indian public sector undertaking which is engaged in the manufacture of railway wagons, cranes and other engineering services. It is wholly owned by the Government of India and under the administrative control of the Ministry of Railways. Its headquarters are located at Kolkata, West Bengal.

Manufacturing units
The company has three units – Clive Works, Victoria Works both in Calcutta, and Angus Works in Hooghly District, West Bengal. From 2010 the administrative control of the subsidiary has been taken over by the Indian Railways.

History
The company was established in 1913 as the Indian Subsidiary of Braithwaite & Co. Engineers Limited (U.K.), for the fabrication of structural steel works. 
In 1930, it was incorporated as Braithwaite & Co (India) Ltd at Calcutta. 
In 1960, Braithwaite's Angus Works located at Champdani was set up to manufacture cranes, foundry products, machinery components, etc. 
In 1976, the company was nationalized and taken over by Government of India
In 1978, the Project Division was established at Calcutta to execute turnkey projects for material handling plants. 
IN 1986, the company was one of five government undertakings, all of them related to heavy engineering and located in eastern India, which was placed under the umbrella of Bharat Heavy Udyam Ltd, a newly devised holding company
In 1987, the Victoria Works was taken over, which is equipped with all facilities for the manufacture of pressure vessels, railway wagons, and heavy structurals for bridges and other engineering applications.
In August 2010, the administrative control of the company was taken over by the Ministry of Railways.

Present status

In 1986, Braithwaite & Co., Ltd. came under the umbrella of Bharat Bhari Udyog Nigam, which became holding company of five companies in eastern India, namely:
Braithwate & Co. Ltd,
Burn Standard Company
Bharat Wagon and Engineering
Braithwaite, Burn & Jessop Construction Company
Jessop & Co. Ltd (this company was later privatized)

With effect from 2010, the management of Braithwaite & Co. Limited has been transferred from the Ministry of Heavy Industries & Public Enterprises to the Ministry of Railways, Government of India. Today Braithwaite is an engineering conglomerate that manufactures:
Railway wagons & bogies
Heavy-duty cranes
Structurals
Jute mill machinery and 
Forging & casting jobs.

Miniratna category-I status
Braithwaite & Co, under the UPA Government in 2010 got enlisted for disinvestment, since the engineering firm made a turnaround with a manifold increase in annual turnover and profits for three consecutive years, in January 2022 it received recognition as a Mini Ratna-I public sector undertaking.

References

External links
 Braithwaite

Government-owned companies of India
Companies nationalised by the Government of India
Engineering companies of India
Manufacturing companies based in Kolkata
Coach and wagon manufacturers of India
Manufacturing companies established in 1913
Indian companies established in 1913
Indian companies established in 1930
Indian companies established in 1976